The Strong Man is a 1926 American silent comedy film starring Harry Langdon.

Along with Tramp, Tramp, Tramp, The Strong Man is Langdon's best known film.  Capra would also direct Langdon's next feature, Long Pants (1927), which would be their final collaboration.

Plot

Paul Bergot (Harry Langdon) is a Belgian emigrant to the United States who has fallen in love with Mary Brown (Priscilla Bonner), a blind woman.  They met as pen-pals when he was fighting in Europe during World War I.  Mary even sent Paul a photo of herself.

Paul searches for Mary Brown by asking every woman he meets if she is Mary Brown. By accident he rescues her town from crooks and bootleggers.

Cast
 Harry Langdon as Paul Bergot
 Priscilla Bonner as Mary Brown
 Gertrude Astor as Lily of Broadway
 William V. Mong as Holy Joe
 Robert McKim as Mike McDevitt
 Arthur Thalasso as Zandow the Great

Reception

Critical response
The staff at Variety magazine liked the film and wrote, "A whale of a comedy production that has a wealth of slapstick, a rough-and-tumble finish and in the earlier passages bits of pantomimic comedy that are notable. Harry Langdon has a comic method distinct from other film fun makers. The quality of pathos enters into it more fully than the style of any other comedian with the possible exception of Chaplin. His gift of legitimate comedy here has a splendid vehicle."

More recently, critic Maria Schneider reviewed Langdon's work and wrote, "Not surprisingly, Langdon was most often cast as an oblivious innocent adrift in a corrupt world, a formula that made him terrifically popular in the mid-1920s. Of the three features Kino has released, The Strong Man (1926) is the best...Crisply timed and almost perfectly paced, it is also notable as Frank Capra's directorial debut."

Critic Richard von Busack wrote, "A little tragedy and a lot of laughs can be seen in 1926's The Strong Man... Later, on the crowded bus out west, Langdon demonstrates a sterling silent comedy bit: the one about the goof who mistakes a jar of stenchy Limburger cheese for Vicks' VapoRub. With exquisite deadpan, Langdon keeps the incident from being too sad; he deftly, repeatedly, sucker-punches a bully who protests against the smell. Director Frank Capra's energy and sturdy plot sense counterpoint Langdon's wonderful strangeness."

Reviewing Langdon's career and movies, silent film critic and author Dan Navarro wrote, "When Harry Langdon's Tramp, Tramp, Tramp premiered in March 1926, it was greeted by moviegoers as a worthy challenger to the great films of Charles Chaplin, Buster Keaton, and Harold Lloyd. Langdon was hailed as 'the fourth comedy genius.' That heady feeling was reinforced when, in September 1926, Langdon appeared in an even better picture, Frank Capra's The Strong Man...[the film] was Frank Capra's first directorial effort, and his genius shines through."

Awards
In 2007, The Strong Man was selected for preservation in the United States National Film Registry by the Library of Congress as being "culturally, historically, or aesthetically significant."

See also
 List of United States comedy films

References

External links

The Strong Man essay by Bill Schelly at National Film Registry 

 
 
 
 Harry Langdon article at Images Journal by Gary Johnson
 The Strong Man essay by Daniel Eagan in America's Film Legacy: The Authoritative Guide to the Landmark Movies in the National Film Registry, A&C Black, 2010 , pages 119-120 

1926 films
American silent feature films
Silent American comedy films
American black-and-white films
Films about blind people
Films directed by Frank Capra
United States National Film Registry films
1926 directorial debut films
1926 comedy films
1920s American films